Richard Stearns may refer to:

Richard Stearns (World Vision), president of the evangelical charity World Vision
Richard E. Stearns (born 1936), American theoretical computer scientist
Richard G. Stearns (born 1944), United States federal judge
Richard Stearns (sailor) (born 1927), American Olympic sailor
R. H. Stearns (1824–1909), tradesman, philanthropist, and politician from Massachusetts

See also
Richard Sterne (disambiguation)
Richard Stern (disambiguation)